Psychopathics from Outer Space Part 3 is a compilation album that features new tracks by every artist on the independent rap label Psychopathic Records, released on Tuesday, November 13, 2007.

Track listing

2007 compilation albums
Record label compilation albums
Psychopathic Records compilation albums
Hip hop compilation albums